Selania is a genus of moths belonging to the subfamily Olethreutinae of the family Tortricidae.

Species
Selania acquiescens Diakonoff, 1976
Selania aeologramma (Meyrick, 1916)
Selania bengalica (Obraztsov, 1968)
Selania capparidana (Zeller, 1847)
Selania costifuscana Aarvik, 2004
Selania detrita (Meyrick, 1928)
Selania diplosperma (Diakonoff, 1984)
Selania exornata (Diakonoff, 1969)
Selania friganosa Kuznetzov, in Danilevsky & Kuznetsov, 1968
Selania leplastriana (Curtis, 1831)
Selania macella Diakonoff, 1976
Selania minuta (Obraztsov, 1968)
Selania planifrontana (Rebel, 1912)
Selania resedana (Obraztsov, 1959)

See also
List of Tortricidae genera

References

External links
tortricidae.com

Grapholitini
Tortricidae genera